The Thunder Machine is a fictional, four wheeled, armored, weaponized vehicle used by the Dreadnoks, a biker gang/mercenary group in the G.I. Joe: A Real American Hero comic books and cartoon series. The Dreadnoks work for Cobra, the primary enemy for G.I. Joe.

Description
The vehicle was created and driven by Thrasher, one of the newer members of the Dreadnoks. The fiction describes it as cobbled together from parts salvaged from several different vehicles, including a 1980s model Pontiac Trans-Am, a dune buggy, a pickup truck and various others. The Thunder Machine is propelled by a jet engine similar to jet-propelled dragsters. This made it fast but hard to maneuver. The vehicle was built on a military truck chassis, similar to a Humvee. It had armor plating riveted over most of the exterior surface. The armor is believed to be from old tanks, and according to Thrasher, the Thunder Machine is capable of taking as much, if not, more damage than a Cobra H.I.S.S tank. The front tires were racing tires, adding some maneuverability. Since an engine wasn't required, the front of the truck was replaced with the nose of a 1970s era Pontiac Trans Am on top of which was mounted a roll cage and two huge armor-piercing Gatling guns. In a nod to many of the original Mad Max vehicles, which were Australian police cars, the vehicle has a police light bar mounted on the roof.

Toy

As a toy, it was available for purchase in 1986, complete with the action figure of the Thrasher. It featured belt-fed synchronized "Penetrator" Gatling guns, and had room for a driver, passenger, and eight people standing on the running boards.

In 1993, it was recast, and released as the "Beast Blaster", as part of the Street Fighter II toy line, also produced by Hasbro at the time. It was also released in Venezuela, in slightly different colors.

Comics

Marvel Comics
The vehicle first appears in G.I.Joe #51. A Dreadnok-led escape by Zartan from Joe Headquarters leads to a multi-vehicle chase through the swamps. The Thunder Machine's weapons severely damages Heavy Metal's MAULER tank and easily knocks aside Crankcase's A.W.E. Striker. It comes down to Cross Country and Sgt. Slaughter on the HAVOC vehicle chasing the Thunder Machine. Thrasher's driving skills, weaponry and willingness to take suicidal risks allow the Dreadnoks to temporarily escape the HAVOC. Sgt. Slaughter actually finds them later but the team's disguise skills are sufficient to fool him.

In issue #69, Thrasher, Monkeywrench and Zarana were in it as it was driven out a besieged Cobra base called a Terror Drome situated in the fictional war-torn country of Sierra Gordo. It was driven to a large airfield and abandoned when the Dreadnoks took over a G.I.Joe transport plane.

Another version was featured in issues #74-76. Acting Cobra Commander uses it as his personal transport vehicle during a civil war on Cobra Island. The vehicle's firepower destroys one of the Joe team's C-130 transport planes. It then crashes to an Iron Grenadier D.E.M.O.N. tank ridden by Destro himself. It survives, albeit flipped over, a blast from this powerful, well-built vehicle which had been built by Destro's weapons manufacturing division. Thrasher's ill-thought decision to use grenades to turn it back over leaves it structurally sound but with engine problems. It still manages to get the Dreadnoks and Cobra Commander back to their own troops, thus playing a vital part in the Cobra civil war.

In issue #76, Thrasher, his vehicle and other Dreadnoks are captured after a brief firefight with the G.I.Joe team. During the shooting, Thrasher says "I got a brand new Thunder Machine and it ain't even warmed up yet!".

The Dreadnoks and the Thunder Machine are featured in issue #79. Despite explicit orders to lay low, the Dreadnoks decide to attack a military convoy on the streets of New Jersey. This version was totalled by Cross Country driving the H.A.V.O.C., with the assistance of the K-9 teams Law and Order and Mutt and Junkyard.

Devil's Due
The vehicle stayed with the Dreadnoks over the intervening seven years that Cobra was thought to be inoperative. It is used early on by Zanya, daughter of Zartan, as her personal conveyance. She drives it away from Dreadnok headquarters a short time before it comes under siege by Joe forces. The Machine ends up involved in the fight anyway, it was knocked into the swamp by Wild Bill.

Later, it is seen being loaded on a supply plane. The Dreadnoks were helping to rescue Cobra Commander from a new army led by Serpentor, who had established themselves on Cobra Island.

IDW
In IDW's continuation of the original Larry Hama storyline, the Thunder Machine is seen being upgraded in an abandoned gas station in the New Jersey Pine Barrens.  Later it is used as an escape vehicle by an assortment of fighters temporarily opposed to Cobra Commander's plans. One of the opposition group is Zartan, who convinced the Dreadnoks to assist.

Cartoon
The Thunder Machine debuted in the five part mini-series "Arise, Serpentor, Arise". Thrasher uses it to pursue Joe forces in an ultimately successful attempt audition for membership in the Dreadnoks.

Other media

Puzzle
The Thunder Machine is also featured in a puzzle image from Milton Bradley, with art by Dave Dorman.

Other works
The Thunder Machine toy is briefly featured in the fiction novel 6 Sick Hipsters. In the story, the character Paul Achting spent four years collecting G.I. Joe figures to set up a battle scene between the Joes and Cobra. As he imagined the characters in his head, he described the Thunder Machine as "a red and black behemoth that was as postapocalyptic as Mad Max himself".

The Thunder Machine was pictured in a September 1986 issue of 'Mother Jones' magazine, in an article about the television industry's relation to toys.

References

Sources

 
 
 Mother Jones Magazine September 1986, page 42

Fictional armoured fighting vehicles
G.I. Joe vehicles